A computer game is a type of video game played on a personal computer. It may also refer to a video game in general.

Computer game may also refer to:
 
PC Games (magazine)
Computer and Video Games, video games magazine
Computer Games Magazine, video games magazine
"Computer Game" (song), 1978 song by Yellow Magic Orchestra
"Computer Games" (song), 1979 song by Mi-Sex
Computer Games (album), 1982 album by George Clinton
Computer Games, reissue title of the album Graffiti Crimes by Mi-Sex